James Adam Littlejohn (8 July 1910, Glasgow – 24 August 1989, Dundee) was a Scottish football player and manager.

Career
He won Scotland junior international caps before joining St Johnstone in 1934. He moved to Cowdenbeath in 1939, but signed for Dundee United under wartime conditions.

He was influential in the club's unexpected progress to the final of the Emergency War Cup at Hampden Park, when he led the side following an injury to captain Jerry Kerr (United lost 1–0 to Rangers). That was the only season he played for United, but he was invited to join the board in 1942 and after the abrupt departure of manager Jimmy Allan in October of that year, he was asked by fellow directors to take over. He remained in post for just over two years, a period in which United struggled in the North Eastern League as they found it difficult to attract the better players available during the unusual conditions of wartime. Littlejohn handed over the manager's job to one of his players, Charlie McGillivray, in November 1944, but remained a director.

With the exception of three years when he stepped down due to ill health, he was a board member for the rest of his life, though his greatest contribution to Dundee United was the establishment of Taypools. It was he who spotted the scheme's potential, and without its invaluable financial input it is unlikely that the club could have become established in Division One during the 1960s.

His son, Bill, was a director at Tannadice from 1989 to 2002 and the club's chief executive between October 2000 and January 2002.

References

1910 births
Scottish footballers
Footballers from Glasgow
1989 deaths
Dundee United F.C. wartime guest players
Scottish football managers
Dundee United F.C. managers
Dundee United F.C. directors and chairmen
Association football central defenders
St Johnstone F.C. players
St Anthony's F.C. players
Directors of football clubs in Scotland
Scottish Football League players
Scottish Junior Football Association players
Cowdenbeath F.C. players
20th-century Scottish businesspeople